Flower Lane Church (Pinyin: Huāxiàng Jīdū Jiàotáng; Foochow Romanized: Huă-háe̤ng Gĭ-dók Gáu-dòng) is a Christian church in Fuzhou, China.

Location 
The church is located at Flower Lane No. 7, East Street Crossroads (Dongjiekou), the most prosperous downtown area of Gulou District, Fuzhou. It is the first Methodist church built within the walled city of Fuzhou.

History 
The history of Flower Lane Church can be traced back to 1863 when the American Methodist Episcopal Mission in Fuzhou secured a house and lot on East Street within the city walls. In 1864, a chapel known as East Street Church was erected there, but was demolished by a mob the next year. It was not until 50 years later that the Methodist Episcopal Mission decided to make another attempt to erect a church within downtown Fuzhou.

In 1915, Rev. John Gowdy (then superintendent of the Methodist Episcopal Mission) and Rev. Yu Xingli (a Chinese Methodist pastor) purchased on East Street what used to be the mansion of a Ryukyuan king in Qing Dynasty and rebuilt it into a city institutional church named Central Institutional Church or Siong Iu Dong (Foochow Romanized: Siông-iū-dòng, lit. "church for social intercourse"). The first baptism was held on September 5 of the same year. In 1938 the building was subsequently reconstructed under charge of Rev. Xu Rongfan into a large granite chapel capable of holding a congregation of some 1000 people.

In the Republic of China Era, Siong Iu Dong was an influential religious organization, working chiefly for the official and literary class. It established Jinde School (later changed to Jinde Girls' Middle School / ) which was engaged in the teaching of modern culture and served as the preparatory school for Foochow Anglo-Chinese College, and also founded Siong Iu Dong Kindergarten. But all school activities were put to an end during the Japanese Occupation in the 1940s.

After the communists' 1949 victory in the Chinese Civil War, all foreign missions were forced to leave this country and forbidden from interacting with churches in China. In the 1950s Siong Iu Dong was affiliated to the Three-Self Patriotic Movement (TSPM), subordinate to the communist control. During the Cultural Revolution (1966–1976), however, even the TSPM was strictly banned, and all church services ceased. The Senior Pastor Rev. Liu Yangfen was severely persecuted for his outspoken Christian faith.

On October 28, 1979, Siong Iu Dong became the first church in Fuzhou to restore religious activities, with its name changed to Flower Lane Church, after the street name of its location. Rev. Liu Yangfen was assigned as pastor in charge.

The main building of the Flower Lane Church was renovated in 2005.

Famous people associated with the church 
 John Gowdy (1869–1963), Methodist missionary to China, founder of the church. He was elected a Bishop of the Methodist Episcopal Church in 1930.
 Frank Thomas Cartwright (1884–1964), Methodist missionary to China. He arrived in Foochow in 1917 and was in charge of the church until his eviction in 1949.
 Chen Wenyuan (1897–1968), Bishop of the Methodist Episcopal Church in China. He became a pastor of the church in the 1930s, and was persecuted in the 1950s.
 Liu Yangfen (1915–2010), son of Methodist converts in Foochow. Liu graduated from Vanderbilt University, and was pastor of the church from 1950 to 1966 and from 1979 to 1985. He was persecuted during Cultural Revolution and was sent for reeducation to the labor farms in Northern Fujian. In 1985 he left China for New York City and started the Church of Grace to Fujianese for Fuzhou immigrants.

Photo gallery

References

Churches in Fuzhou
Protestant churches in China
Methodism in China
20th-century Methodist church buildings
Christian organizations established in 1915